Antioch Township is a township in White County, Arkansas, United States. Its total population was 562 as of the 2010 United States Census, an increase of 15.4 percent from 487 at the 2000 census.

According to the 2010 Census, Antioch Township is located at  (35.141235, -91.940339).

References

External links 

Townships in Arkansas
Populated places in White County, Arkansas